Ingrosso is a surname. Notable people with the surname include:

Benjamin Ingrosso (born 1997), Swedish singer and actor earlier known as Benjamin Wahlgren Ingrosso
Bianca Wahlgren Ingrosso (born 1994), Swedish singer
Emilio Ingrosso (born 1965), Swedish dancer and composer
Gianmarco Ingrosso (born 1989), Italian football (soccer) player
Oliver Ingrosso (born 1989), Swedish DJ, record producer and actor. Also credited as Oliver Wahlgren Ingrosso
Sebastian Ingrosso (born 1983), Swedish DJ and electronic dance music producer.

See also
Axwell and Ingrosso, stylised as Axwell Λ Ingrosso, a Swedish DJ/producer duo made up of Axwell and Sebastian Ingrosso